Horne & Corden is a British sketch show written by Jon Brown, Steve Dawson, Andrew Dawson, Tim Inman and the cast, script edited by Sam Ward, and starring Mathew Horne and James Corden. It aired on BBC television in 2009. The first episode was broadcast on 10 March 2009 on BBC Three. It is presented by stars Mathew Horne and James Corden in front of a live audience, featuring pre-recorded sketches (often on location) and vignettes filmed in a studio with an audience. Several episodes featured a song and dance routine as their finale. The first episode attracted the highest ratings for a comedy show debut on BBC Three, however, ratings quickly dropped throughout the show's run.

In Australia, all six episodes were also aired on ABC2 (and the ABC iView catch-up service) from 1 September to 6 October 2009 in the Thursday 9pm timeslot.

Cast
Mathew Horne as Various
James Corden as Various
Rob Brydon as Sports commentator
Nick Mohammed as Ensemble (various roles)
Kellie Bright as Ensemble (various roles)
Mathew Baynton as Ensemble (various roles)
Helen Cripps as Ensemble (various roles)

Episodes

Reception
Although the first episode of the show attracted 817,000 viewers, making it most-watched debut for a comedy series on BBC Three, the reviews for Horne & Corden were critical. Benji Wilson of the Daily Telegraph said that the show "was about as funny as credit default swaps". while Rachel Cooke in the New Statesman called it "excruciating – as funny and as puerile as a sixth-form revue". Sam Wollaston from The Guardian wrote:

"There's a sketch about a gay war reporter, a cock-drawing class in a boys' school, Spiderman and Superman meet in the changing rooms, a bloke takes forever to reach orgasm. Clever, see? It's crude, but that's not the problem; crude can be funny. Not here, though, because of how artlessly it's done. It looks as if they've just thought of these comedy situations, and then not really known how to fill them in. Never has a three-minute sketch felt so long, and the joke inevitably comes down to the fact that James Corden is fat and is happy to show us his wobbly bits. Or one of them gets his arse out."
 
Harry Venning, writer of radio sitcom Clare in the Community and head television critic for The Stage speculated that over-exposure and hubris had led Horne and Corden to think they could just turn up and make people laugh. The duo "deserve everything they get ... They are actors, not comedians. The whole thing was terrible. Corden has a bit of comic persona, but Horne hasn't any. He was stuck in this awful straight-man role. What really annoys me is this attitude that they've had a hit sitcom – done that – so writing a sketch show should be easy. What happened to quality control? Didn't anyone think, 'We need to get in some writers'? It's a shame because I like them both. They are very good actors."

Some reviews were positive. Keith Watson from Metro said that: "When it calmed down, it hit the spot: Corden does a very sharp Ricky Gervais and the pair of them combining as dancing magic act Jonny Lee Miller stretched things into the surreal. But they need to get over the need to whip each others' kits off. Come on, guys, get a room."

Tom Sutcliffe from The Independent was also more positive saying: "They're both talented comic actors (Corden, in particular, did a note-perfect piss-take of Ricky Gervais, scene-stealing shamelessly as he performed in a remake of The Karate Kid), so where there were dips, it was usually the result of material rather than delivery. And, though it would be ridiculously early to write it off, it was worrying that their opener should have been so reliant on material that struck you as a bit end-of-term-revue in character. Corden's naked body was treated as a kind of get-out-jail-free card, with no less than three sketches in which he got his kit off and at least one more in which the only gag derived from his obesity."

Overnight ratings for the second episode were down 136,000 from the first show. The third episode attracted 502,000 viewers — down 305,000 from the first episode and 179,000 from the second. The fourth episode went up in the ratings, attracting 650,000 viewers, with a 4.5% share of the audience, but the fifth saw a substantial decrease with just 392,000 viewers. The final episode drew a "disappointing" 434,000 viewers. However, despite the fall, it managed more than almost all other shows on digital channels with that slot.

In March 2010, Corden stated that the sketch show was a mistake.

Pulled sketch
In the first episode of Horne & Corden, there was a sketch (developed by Horne and Corden themselves on the set of Gavin & Stacey) featuring two characters called Jonny and Lee Miller, a pair of West Country magicians whose dance routines are better than their magic. In the sketch, they try to "magic away" gun crime. However, the sketch was pulled from three repeats and was edited out of the edition on the BBC iPlayer because of the Winnenden school shooting in Germany, which occurred the day after the show was first broadcast. The BBC said in a statement: "Following the tragic events in Winnenden on Wednesday, a decision was taken to remove the final scene of episode one of Horne & Corden for all repeats, including iPlayer." However, on 17 May repeat of the show the sketch was repeated and was on the iPlayer edit. The DVD release of the Show also includes the sketch.

References

External links

2009 British television series debuts
2009 British television series endings
2000s British television sketch shows
BBC television sketch shows
English-language television shows
Television series by Endemol